Pierre Justin Ouvrié or Ouvrié (19 January 1806 - 22 October 1879) was a French painter and lithographer. He was known as Justin Ouvrié from 1852 onwards.

Life 
Born in Sotteville-lès-Rouen, Justin Ouvrié was a student of baron Taylor and Abel de Pujol at the École des beaux-arts de Paris. He exhibited at the Paris Salon from 1831 onwards with views of towns and monuments, sometimes as historical or picturesque scenes.

He was very successful under the July Monarchy, winning a 2nd class medal at the 1831 Salon, a 1st class medal at the 1843 Salon and a 3rd class medal at the 1855 Exposition Universelle as well as being made a chevalier of the Légion d'honneur in 1854. He was a professor at the Maison d'éducation de la Légion d'honneur in Saint-Denis.

He later became blind, after which the paintings in his studio were sold off at the hôtel Drouot on 21 December 1874. Moving to Maisons-Laffitte, he died at Sotteville-lès-Rouen. His pupils included Jean-Joseph Bellel and Paul Chardin.

Salon works

As Pierre Justin Ouvrié
 Landscape - 1831
 Grand Canal, Venice, View of the House of Incurables in Naples, View of the Mont-Saint-Bernard Hospice, View at Landernau (Brittany), The Pont de Pontoise - 1833
 View of Piazza Palazzo Vecchio, Florence, Riva degli Schiavoni, Venice - 1834
 Interior of the Lorenzkirche, Nuremberg, View of the Mont-d'Or Valley (Auvergne), The Aigues-Mortes Lighthouse, Valtin Valley - 1835
 View of the château in Twickenham [High Shot House] near Richmond, lived in by the king [Louis-Philippe of the French] during his stay in England, View of Rouen from Le Cours, San Pietro Church in Genoa, View at Lerici, near La Spezzi, Italy, View of Rouen from the petite chaussée - 1836
 Santa Lucia Quay in Naples,  View of Rouen from the petite chaussée, The Place de Royat near Clermont-Ferrand, Chartres Cathedral from place des Eparts - 1837
 View of Château de Cossigny (Seine-et-Marne), View in the parc de Cossigny - 1838
 The Courtyard of Heidelberg Castle (Grand Duchy of Baden), View of Noël Saint-Martin Church (Oise), View at Chartres, View of the Lorenzer Platz in Nuremberg - 1839
 Oval Courtyard at the château de Fontainebleau, arrival of Queen Christine, View of the village of Ablon-sur-Seine - 1840
 The French Army Marching on Mascara after a sketch by M. Siméon Fort, View of the Castle and Town of Heidelberg, View of Augsburg - 1841
 Château de Fontainebleau, view from the jardin anglais, View of the église de la Roche, near Landernau (Finistère), Church and Calvary at Plougastel-Saint-Germain, near Quimper, View of Taverny, vallée de Montmorency - 1842
 View of château de Chenonceaux on the Cher, Séricourt, near la Ferté-sous-Jouarre The Palais de Saint-Cloud, view from the park - 1843
 View of the château de Pau and Part of the Town of Pau, from the park - 1844
 View of les Eaux-Bonnes (Basses-Pyrénées), Châlet de Séricourt (Seine-et-Marne), View of the Grand Canal in Venice - 1845
 View of the château d'Azay-le-Rideau (Indre-et-Loire), Château d'Ussé (Indre-et-Loire), Memory of Dinan (Côtes-du-Nord), Riva degli Schiavoni in Venice - 1846
 View of the Main Square and Cloth Hall in Ypres (Belgium), View at Amboise - 1847
 Place de la Halle à Bruges (Belgique), Vue prise à Honfleur (Calvados), Le Château de Châteaudun, vue prise des bords de Loir - 1848
 View of rue Flamande in Bruges, View of Saint-Sébastien in Bruges, The Pont Neuf in Chartres - 1849
 Houses of Parliament, Westminster Abbey and Lambeth Palace in London, The Béguinage in Bruges, View of Rouen, taken from Le Cours - 1850

As Justin Ouvrié
 View of Somerset House and Saint Paul's Cathedral, London (United Kingdom) - 1852 (also re-exhibited in 1855)
 Windsor Castle (United Kingdom), The Church at Hastings (United Kingdom) - 1852
 View of Amsterdam - 1853 (also re-exhibited in 1855)
 Banks of the Rhine, Saint-Goars and Rheinfelds, Banks of the Rhine, Oberwesel, Castle and City of Heidelberg, Santa Lucia Quay in Naples - 1855
 Trarbach-sur-Moselle (Rhenish Prussia), Rolandsech and Drackenfels on the Rhine, Boppart, near Koblenz (Prussia), Entrance to The Hague, through the Ryswick Canal (Netherlands) - 1857
 View of Rotterdam - 1859
 Memory of the Banks of the Rhine between Koblenz and Mainz, Mont Blanc and the Chaumont Valley, View of Antwerp, Memory of Italy, road from Ancona to Bologna, The Moselle near Bern-Castel (Rhenish Prussia) - 1861
 View of Salzburg (Austria), The Walter Scott Monument, Calton Hill and Canongate in Edinburgh, The Hereengracht in Amsterdam - 1863
 Le Château d'Anet (Eure-et-Loir), Château de Villepinte (Seine-et-Oise), au Salon de 1864
 Edinburgh from Calton Hill - 1865 (also re-exhibited 1867)
 Château de Pierrefonds in 1864 - 1865
 City and Castle of Heidelberg, Freiburg Cathedral in Brisgau - 1866
 Château de Pierrefonds, Museum Canal in Amsterdam, view from hôtel du Doelen - 1868
 The Printz-Gracht in Amsterdam, Thunn on the River Aar, Bern canton - 1869
 Rotterdam, Saint-Goar and the Rheinfels on the Rhine - 1870
 View of Dordrecht (Netherlands), Amsterdam Wetorhing - 1872
 Alkmaar (Netherlands), Dordrecht (Netherlands) - 1873

Publications 

 The Decorations in the bois de Boulogne, forty views from nature, 1862.

References

Bibliography 
  Émile Bellier de La Chavignerie, Dictionnaire général des artistes de l'École française depuis l'origine des arts du dessin jusqu'à nos jours : architectes, peintres, sculpteurs, graveurs et lithographes, vol 2, p. 187-188, Librairie Renouard, Paris, 1885 (online)
  Geneviève Lacambre, Jacqueline de Rohan-Chabot, Le Musée du Luxembourg en 1874, Paris, Éditions des Musées Nationaux, 1974, p 146

External links
  Base Joconde : Pierre Justin Ouvrié
  data Bnf : Pierre-Justin Ouvrié

19th-century French painters
Landscape painters
Engravers from Paris
French lithographers
Painters from Paris
1806 births
1879 deaths
Chevaliers of the Légion d'honneur